Weyib River (also Webi Gestro; Wabē Gestro or Web River) is a river of eastern Ethiopia. It rises in the Bale Mountains east of Goba in the Oromia Region, flowing east to pass through the Sof Omar Caves, then to the southeast until it joins the Ganale Dorya River in the Somali Region.

See also 
 List of rivers of Ethiopia

References 

Rivers of Ethiopia
Bale Mountains
Ethiopian Highlands
Geography of Oromia Region
Jubba River